The Esther Beller Hoffman Medal is an award given by The Optical Society that recognizes outstanding contributions by individuals around the world to the fields of optical science and engineering education. The award was established in 1993 and past winners include Emil Wolf, Anthony E. Siegman, Ulrich Lemmer and Eric Mazur.

Recipients

 2022 Julie Bentley
 2021 Nicholas Massa
 2020 Julio César Gutiérrez Vega
 2019 Rick Trebino
 2018 Ulrich Lemmer
 2017 C. Martijn de Sterke
 2016 Bishnu P. Pal
 2015 Govind P. Agrawal
 2014 Shin-Tson Wu 
 2013 Vasudevan Lakshminarayanan
 2012 Judy Donnelly
 2011 Stephen M. Pompea
 2010 Eustace L. Dereniak
 2009 Anthony E. Siegman
 2008 Eric Mazur
 2007 M. J. Soileau
 2006 Sang Soo Lee
 2005 Thomas K. Gaylord
 2004 Janice A. Hudgings
 2003 Ajoy K. Ghatak
 2002 Emil Wolf
 2001 Douglas S. Goodman
 2000 Henry Stark
 1999 Bahaa E. A. Saleh
 1998 Amnon Yariv
 1997 Hugh Angus Macleod
 1996 Donald C. O'Shea
 1995 Joseph W. Goodman
 1993 Robert G. Greenler

See also

 List of physics awards

References

Awards of Optica (society)